Hydroxymethylbilane, also known as preuroporphyrinogen, is an organic compound that occurs in living organisms during the synthesis of porphyrins, a group of critical substances that include haemoglobin, myoglobin, and chlorophyll. The name is often abbreviated as HMB.

The compound is a substituted bilane, a chain of four pyrrole rings interconnected by methylene bridges  .  The chain starts with a hydroxymethyl group  and ends with an hydrogen, in place of the respective methylene bridges. The other two carbon atoms of each pyrrole cycle are connected to an acetic acid group  and a propionic acid group , in that order. 

The compound is generated from four molecules of porphobilinogen by the enzyme porphobilinogen deaminase:

The enzyme uroporphyrinogen III synthase closes the chain to form a porphyrinogen a class of compounds with the hexahydroporphine macrocycle; specifically, uroporphyrinogen III.  In the absence of the enzyme, the compound undergoes spontaneous cyclization and becomes uroporphyrinogen I.

References

Tetrapyrroles
Carboxylic acids